Daniele Alexandrovich Amfitheatrof (October 29, 1901 – June 4, 1983) was a Russian-Italian composer and conductor.

Early life

Amfitheatrof was born in Saint Petersburg into a family that was distinguished in various areas of the arts and culture. His father Aleksander Amfiteatrov was a noted writer. His mother Illaria (née Sokoloff), an accomplished singer and pianist, had studied privately with Rimsky-Korsakov. His brother Maksim (Massimo) was an internationally renowned cellist, called the "Cellists' Caruso", who worked with Arturo Toscanini and Fabrizio De André. Daniele's early life was one of extreme hardship. In January 1902, at the age of three months, he was removed to Siberia, where his father was imprisoned for publishing anti-Tsarist articles. In 1904 the authorities returned the family to St. Petersburg, after which time they emigrated to Italy.

At the age of six, Daniele commenced private music studies with his mother. In 1914, he was accepted as a student by Ottorino Respighi in Rome. Shortly thereafter, however, the family returned to Russia, where Alexander Amfitheatrof was appointed as political advisor to Alexander Kerensky during the few months that he was prime minister before the Bolshevik Revolution in 1917. In spite of the political and social upheavals of the time, young Daniele received formal instruction in harmony under Nikolai Shcherbachov and Jāzeps Vītols at the Petrograd Conservatory between 1916 and 1918. In 1921, he was permitted to travel to Prague, Czechoslovakia for further study in counterpoint under Jaroslav Křička.

After four years of ongoing hardships, the Amfitheatrof family escaped from Soviet Russia. Their perilous crossing through the Gulf of Finland was made in the dead of night. The family returned to Italy in the spring of 1922. Daniele became a naturalised Italian citizen and resumed his formal music training under Respighi. He received his diploma in composition from the Royal Conservatory of Santa Cecilia in Rome in 1924.

Composer and conductor

Following his graduation, Amfitheatrof took his place in Italian music circles of the day. In 1924 he was appointed pianist, organist, and assistant choral conductor of the Augusteo Symphony of Rome. Successive appointments included a position as the artistic director of the Italian Radio in Genoa and Trieste (1929–1932), as well as the management of RAI in Turin, where he also conducted many symphony concerts, choral works and operas at the Teatro Regio di Torino (1932–1937). He also traveled extensively throughout Europe, conducting many of the leading orchestras there. Amfitheatrof's success as a composer in his own right was assured early on in his professional career by performances of his concert works, including Poema del mare (1925), Miracolo della rosa (1926) and Christmas Rhapsody for Organ and Orchestra (1928) and American Panorama (1933). Later, he composed his first film score for Max Ophüls' La Signora di tutti (1934).

Arrival in the United States of America

Following the premiere of his programmatic work American Panorama (1935), which was conducted by Dimitri Mitropoulos in Turin in 1937, Amfitheatrof was invited by the Minneapolis Symphony Orchestra to a position as Mitropoulos's associate for the first two months of the 1937–1938 concert season. Amfitheatrof arrived in the United States with his wife (née May C Semenza), his son, Erik (b. 1931), and daughter, Stella Renata (b. 1934), at New York Harbor on October 21, 1937. His arrival was noted in the New York papers. Amfitheatrof's busy schedule with the Minneapolis Symphony Orchestra included concerts in regional Minnesota and the province of Manitoba. His appearances were well liked by audiences and received much favourable press. Amfitheatrof also accepted a brief engagement with the Boston Symphony Orchestra at the behest of their conductor, Serge Koussevitsky, in 1938.

Hollywood
With World War II imminent in Europe, Amfitheatrof elected to remain in the United States. He relocated his family to California on the recommendation of Boris Morros, then director of music at Paramount Pictures. Amfitheatrof was hired by Metro-Goldwyn-Mayer Studios under an exclusive four-year contract (1939–1943). His scores at MGM include those for Lassie Come Home, the first major film of a young Elizabeth Taylor. During his twenty-six years in Hollywood, where he was employed by each of the major studios at one time for another, he composed the scores (often uncredited) for over 50 films, including Letter from an Unknown Woman, The Desert Fox, The Naked Jungle, The Last Hunt, and The Mountain. His final score was written for Major Dundee in 1965. (This score, which was disliked by many, including director Sam Peckinpah, was replaced with a new score by Christopher Caliendo for the reconstructed version, which was released theatrically in 2005; both scores can be heard on the DVD, released later that year).

Amfitheatrof was twice nominated for an Oscar for his work on Guest Wife and Song of the South. Amfitheatrof once remarked in written correspondence (citation: private letters) with his friend and colleague, John Steven Lasher, that his career in Hollywood "as a prostitute composer" ultimately tarnished his image as a professional musician. As a result, he was unable to secure commissions or performances of his concert works.

Final years
Amfitheatrof returned to Italy in 1959 and lived there for the most part until 1967. He made frequent visits to the United States during the final 15 years of his life. Plans to secure funding for a stage musical called The Staring Match, the production of a film, and the completion of a cello concerto, were all doomed to failure. His final years were spent in relative seclusion in Venice and in Rome, where he died on June 4, 1983.

Partial filmography

 Lassie Come Home (1943)
 I'll Be Seeing You (1944)
 The Captain from Köpenick (completed in 1941, released in 1945)
 Guest Wife (1945)
 Miss Susie Slagle's (1946)
 The Virginian (1946)
 Song of the South (1946)
 Temptation (1946)
 Suspense (1946)
 The Lost Moment (1947)
 Ivy (1947)
 Time Out of Mind (1947)
 The Senator Was Indiscreet (1947)
 Letter from an Unknown Woman (1948)
 Another Part of the Forest (1948)
 Rogues' Regiment (1948)
 An Act of Murder (1948)
 The Fan (1949)
 The Capture (1950)
 Copper Canyon (1950)
 The Damned Don't Cry! (1950)
 Bird of Paradise (1951)
 Storm Warning (1951)
 The Desert Fox (1951)
 Devil's Canyon (1953)
 The Naked Jungle (1954)
 Human Desire (1954)
 Day of Triumph (1954)
 The Last Hunt (1956)
 The Mountain (1956)
 From Hell to Texas (1958)
 Heller in Pink Tights (1960)
 Major Dundee (1965)

References

External links
 
 

1901 births
1983 deaths
20th-century Italian composers
20th-century Italian conductors (music)
20th-century Italian male musicians
Accademia Nazionale di Santa Cecilia alumni
Emigrants from the Russian Empire to Italy
Italian male composers
Italian male conductors (music)
Italian people of Russian descent
Musicians from Saint Petersburg
Soviet emigrants to Italy
White Russian emigrants to Italy